Roberto Clemente Stadium is a baseball stadium  in Masaya, Nicaragua. It is named after Puerto Rican baseball player Roberto Clemente, who died in a plane crash that was delivering aid to the victims of the 1972 Nicaragua earthquake.

References

External links
Estadio Roberto Clemente on Google Earth Placemark
Estadio Roberto Clemente on TravelingLuck
Estadio Robert Clemente on Mapcarta

Baseball venues in Nicaragua
Masaya Department